He Jiting (born 19 February 1998) is a Chinese badminton player. As a junior player, his best achievements was winning the boys' doubles at the 2015 Asian and World Junior Championships, later won the mixed doubles at the 2016 Asian and World Junior Championships. He was part of the national team that lifted the Tong Yun Kai Cup at the 2019 Asia Mixed Team Championships, and at the 2021 Sudirman Cup.

Achievements

BWF World Championships 
Men's doubles

Asian Championships 
Mixed doubles

BWF World Junior Championships 
Boys' doubles

Mixed doubles

Asian Junior Championships 
Boys' doubles

Mixed doubles

BWF World Tour (2 titles, 5 runners-up) 
The BWF World Tour, which was announced on 19 March 2017 and implemented in 2018, is a series of elite badminton tournaments sanctioned by the Badminton World Federation (BWF). The BWF World Tour is divided into levels of World Tour Finals, Super 1000, Super 750, Super 500, Super 300, and the BWF Tour Super 100.

Men's doubles

Mixed doubles

BWF Grand Prix (2 titles) 
The BWF Grand Prix had two levels, the Grand Prix and Grand Prix Gold. It was a series of badminton tournaments sanctioned by the Badminton World Federation (BWF) and played between 2007 and 2017.

Mixed doubles

  BWF Grand Prix Gold tournament
  BWF Grand Prix tournament

References

External links 
 

1998 births
Living people
Sportspeople from Fuzhou
Badminton players from Fujian
Chinese male badminton players
21st-century Chinese people